Vemund Brekke Skard (born 11 September 1981) is a Norwegian former professional footballer who played as a forward or midfielder.

Career
Born in Brumunddal, Skard signed his first professional contract having joined from  Norwegian Second Division side Brumunddal FK in October 2005, where he played part-time whilst also training to be a teacher. He signed for Ipswich Town in 2005 but was released early in the 2006–07 season after just three appearances for the club.

He later played for Catalan team CE L'Hospitalet, Raufoss IL in Adeccoligaen (2007) and IL Hødd (2008). After several seasons in his native Brumunddal he featured briefly for Stabæk Fotball 2 in 2014. Developing as a football coach, in 2017 he studied for the UEFA A Licence.

References

External links
Football Association of Norway Profile

1981 births
Living people
People from Ringsaker
Norwegian footballers
Association football midfielders
Association football forwards
Ipswich Town F.C. players
CE L'Hospitalet players
Raufoss IL players
IL Hødd players
Norwegian First Division players
Norwegian expatriate footballers
Norwegian expatriate sportspeople in England
Expatriate footballers in England
Norwegian expatriate sportspeople in Spain
Expatriate footballers in Spain
Sportspeople from Innlandet